A semi-automatic rifle is a rifle that fires a single round each time the trigger is pulled, and uses some of the energy from that firing to load the next round. Semi-automatic rifles are also known as self-loading rifles ('SLR') or auto-loading rifles.

See also

References

Rifles
Semi-automatic rifles